Williams Plains is a historic home located in the White Marsh Recreational Park at Bowie in Prince George's County, Maryland, United States.

The house was built for the Hon. John Johnson (1770-1824), judge of the Maryland Court of Appeals, who purchased the property in 1812.

It is a -story brick house, with a Flemish bond south facade and six-course common bond used for the remaining walls. It is an early- to mid-19th-century brick house which is significant primarily for the Greek Revival–influenced interior decorative detailing which remains almost completely intact and thus is an excellent and somewhat rare record of domestic architecture in Prince George's County in the first half of the 19th century. The dominant design elements which characterize the decorative detailing include Greek Revival influenced trim, mantels, and paneled doors.  A much lower -story wing, likely dating to 1942, projects from the northern portion of the east side. The bricks of the wing are laid in stretcher bond, and is a veneer-over-frame construction.

Williams Plains was listed on the National Register of Historic Places in 1980.

Gallery

References

External links

, including photo in 1980, at Maryland Historical Trust website

Houses in Prince George's County, Maryland
Buildings and structures in Bowie, Maryland
Houses on the National Register of Historic Places in Maryland
Neoclassical architecture in Maryland
Greek Revival houses in Maryland
National Register of Historic Places in Prince George's County, Maryland